Alpha Pi Sigma Sorority Incorporated (ΑΠΣ) is a multicultural Latina-based sorority founded in 1990 at San Diego State University. It was created to bring together and support the Latina women but is open to non-Latinas. The sorority has seventeen chapters in five states.

History 
Thirteen Latina women established Alpha Pi Sigma on March 10, 1990, at San Diego State University. They saw the need to unite and support Latina women on university campuses.

The sorority's founders established six purposes that define the organization. The chapters carry out these purposes, including academic excellence, leadership development, cultural awareness, unity and friendship, empowerment, and community service. However, academic excellence is the sorority's primary value, along with community service.

The sorority is a member of the National Association of Latino Fraternal Organizations (NALFO) and holds a strict anti-hazing policy.

Philanthropy 
Both active sisters and alumnae are encouraged to raise funds to support the sorority's national philanthropy. Chapters also select their philanthropies and volunteer in the Latino community. Some examples of the Alpha Pi Sigma efforts are  American Cancer Society, autism awareness, lunch distribution, heart disease awareness, a Tijuana-based orphanage, and Relay for Life.

Chapters 
There are seventeen active chapters of Alpha Pi Sigma in the United States, most in California. Active chapters are indicated in bold. Inactive chapters are indicated in italic.

References

Further reading
 
 

Student organizations established in 1990
National Association of Latino Fraternal Organizations
Student societies in the United States
Hispanic and Latino American organizations
1990 establishments in California